Jeanne Marie Beauprey (born June 21, 1961, in Anaheim, California) is an American former competitive volleyball player and Olympic silver medalist.  Beauprey played NCAA women's volleyball while a student at UCLA.

References

 

American women's volleyball players
UCLA Bruins women's volleyball players
Volleyball players at the 1984 Summer Olympics
Olympic silver medalists for the United States in volleyball
1961 births
Sportspeople from Anaheim, California
Living people
Medalists at the 1984 Summer Olympics
Pan American Games medalists in volleyball
Pan American Games silver medalists for the United States
Medalists at the 1983 Pan American Games